Pascal, Pascal's or PASCAL may refer to:

People and fictional characters
 Pascal (given name), including a list of people with the name
 Pascal (surname), including a list of people and fictional characters with the name
 Blaise Pascal, French mathematician, physicist, inventor, philosopher, writer and theologian

Places
 Pascal (crater), a lunar crater
 Pascal Island (Antarctica)
 Pascal Island (Western Australia)

Science and technology
 Pascal (unit), the SI unit of pressure
 Pascal (programming language), a programming language developed by Niklaus Wirth
 PASCAL (database), a bibliographic database maintained by the Institute of Scientific and Technical Information
 Pascal (microarchitecture), codename for a microarchitecture developed by Nvidia

Other uses
  (1895–1911)
 (1931–1942)
 Pascal and Maximus, fictional characters in Tangled
 Pascal blanc, a French white wine grape
 Pascal College, secondary education school in Zaandam, the Netherlands
 Pascal, trade name of J. Pascal's Furniture and Hardware, Montreal, Canada
 PAS/CAL, a pop band from Detroit, Michigan

See also

 Pascall (disambiguation)
 Paschal (disambiguation)
 Pascual (disambiguation)
 Paskal (disambiguation)
 Pasqual (disambiguation)
 Pasquale (disambiguation)